The 2001 FIA Sportscar Championship was the inaugural season of FIA Sportscar Championship, an auto racing series regulated by the Fédération Internationale de l'Automobile and organized by International Racing Series Ltd. The series was a continuation of the previous SportsRacing World Cup dating back to 1997. It was open to two categories of sports prototypes, SR1 and SR2, and awarded championships to drivers and teams in each category.  A championship for constructors was also established for this season.  It began on 8 April 2001 and ended on 16 September 2001 after eight races.

Italian Marco Zadra won the SR1 drivers' championship, while his BMS Scuderia Italia Ferrari secured the teams' and constructors' titles.  The SR2 class was led by American Larry Oberto and Swede Thed Björk who drove for SportsRacing Team Sweden.  Lola won the constructors' championship in SR2.

Schedule
Despite still sharing regulations with the American Grand Am Road Racing Series, the American series no longer counted toward the new FIA championship.  Kyalami also did not return, leaving the calendar strictly European.  Catalunya, Monza, Spa, Brno, Donington, Magny-Cours, and the Nürburgring were all carried over from the previous season, joined by the Irish Mondello Park.  Monza replaced its former World Cup race with the traditional 1000 km race, adding an endurance event to the calendar.  All other races were limited to 2 hours and 30 minutes of duration.

Entries

SR1

SR2

Results and standings

Race results

Points were awarded to the top eight finishers in each category.  Entries were required to complete 60% of the race distance in order to be classified as a finisher and earn points.  Drivers were required to complete 20% of the total race distance for their car to earn points.  Teams scored points for only their highest finishing entry.

Drivers championships

SR1
Marco Zadra won the SR1 Drivers title at the wheel of a Ferrari 333 SP entered by BMS Scuderia Italia.

SR2
The SR2 Drivers award went to Thed Björk and Larry Oberto who shared a Lola B2K/40-Nissan entered by SportsRacing Team Sweden.

Teams championships

SR1

SR2

Constructor championships

SR1
Ferrari won the SR1 Constructors title.

SR2
The SR2 Constructors award went to Lola Cars International.

References

External links
 Sporting Regulations for the 2001 FIA Sportscar Championship Retrieved from web.archive.org on 1 September 2009
 Round Results from the 2001 FIA Sportscar Championship Retrieved from www.teamdan.com on 1 September 2009
 Championship Classifications for the 2001 FIA Sportscar Championship Retrieved from web.archive.org on 1 September 2009
 Championship Points Tables for the 2001 FIA Sportscar Championship Retrieved from web.archive.org on 1 September 2009
 Championship Round Summaries for the 2001 FIA Sportscar Championship Retrieved from web.archive.org on 1 September 2009
 Images from the 2001 FIA Sportscar Championship Retrieved from www.racingsportscars.com on 1 September 2009

FIA Sportscar Championship
FIA Sportscar Championship